Sir Thomas Cave, 3rd Baronet DL (19 April 1681 – 21 April 1719) of Stanford Hall, Leicestershire was a British Tory politician who sat in the House of Commons from 1711 to 1719.

Cave was the eldest son of Sir Roger Cave, 2nd Baronet and his first wife Martha Browne, daughter of John Browne of Eydon, Northamptonshire. He was educated at Rugby School and matriculated at Christ Church, Oxford on 27 January 1699, aged 16. On 20 February 1703, Cave married Hon. Margaret Verney, youngest daughter of John Verney, 1st Viscount Fermanagh at St Giles's-in-the-Fields Church. He succeeded his father in the baronetcy on 11 October 1703.

Cave was appointed Deputy Lieutenant of Northamptonshire in 1705. He stood successfully for Leicestershire in a by-election on 20 February 1711 and was returned there unopposed at the 1713 general election. At the 1715 general election there was a contest for Leicestershire, but the Sheriff refused to make a return, claiming there had been a riot. Two months later, a fresh election was held at which Cave was returned in a contest. He represented the constituency until his death in 1719.

Cave died on 21 April 1719 aged 38, leaving heavy debts and was buried at Stanford, Northamptonshire. He had two sons and two daughters. He was succeeded in the baronetcy by his sons Verney and Sir Thomas Cave, 5th Baronet successively.

References

1681 births
1719 deaths
Alumni of Christ Church, Oxford
Baronets in the Baronetage of England
British MPs 1710–1713
British MPs 1713–1715
British MPs 1715–1722
Deputy Lieutenants of Northamptonshire
Members of the Parliament of Great Britain for Leicestershire